The United States Air Force has several variants of squadrons focused on communications and cyberspace.


Air and Space Communications Squadrons (ACOMS) 
An Air and Space Communications Squadron is usually assigned to either a standard Numbered Air Force (NAF) or their parent Air Operations Center and directly supports the Air Operations Center.

Communications Groups (CG) and Squadrons (CS) 

The emblems of many communications squadrons feature the armored fist and three lightning bolts of the previous career field's Communications and Information badge, which was based on the emblem first approved for Air Force Communications Service.

Four-digit major command-controlled units

Communications squadrons

Communications Groups

Airways and Air Communications Service squadrons
The first Airways and Air Communications Service (AACS) squadrons were formed on 1 June 1948, when the United States Air Force (USAF) discontinued the Army Air Forces Base Unit system while implementing the Wing Base reorganization (Hobson Plan).  On 1 October 1948, active AACS squadrons were renumbered starting at 1900 when USAF required Major Command controlled units to have four digits contained within blocks of numbers allotted to the commands.  AACS Squadrons active on 1 June 1961 were redesignated as communications squadrons.  Those squadrons numbered in the 1200s were renumbered in the 2100s retaining the last two digits of their AACS number.

USAF Communications Squadrons

 emblems

Communications Support Squadrons (CSPTS or JCSS) 
 Air Combat Command Communications Support Squadron
 224th Joint Communications Support Squadron, formerly 224th Combat Communications Squadron (Contingency), Brunswick, Georgia, Georgia Air National Guard
 290th Joint Communications Support Squadron, MacDill AFB, Florida Air National Guard
 375th Communications Support Squadron, 375th Communications Group, 375th Air Mobility Wing

Expeditionary Communications Squadrons (ECS)

Combat Communications Squadrons (CBCS)

Space Communications Squadrons (SCS) 
A Space Communications Squadron is a Communications Squadron supporting the United States Space Force.

Engineering Installation Squadrons 

|−270th Electronics Installation Group || || PAANG Willow Grove PA  ||

Specialized Communications Squadrons

References 

 
Communications
 List